Raymund can be both a given name and surname. Notable people with the name include:

Given name:
 Raymund Fugger (1489–1535), German businessman, Reichsgraf and art collector
 Raymund Hart (1899–1960), senior commander in the Royal Air Force during World War II
 Raymund Havenith (1947–1993), German classical pianist
 Raymund Schwager (1935–2004), Swiss Roman Catholic priest and theologian

Surname:
 Monica Raymund (born 1986), American actress

See also
 Raymond